Posts and Telecommunications Division(ডাক ও টেলিযোগাযোগ বিভাগ) is the government department responsible for post and telecommunication under the Ministry of Posts, Telecommunications and Information Technology in Bangladesh and is located in Dhaka, Bangladesh.

History
During the term of Tarana Halim as State Minister of Ministry of Posts, Telecommunications and Information Technology, the Bangladesh Telecommunication Regulatory Commission under the Posts and Telecommunications Division of the ministry engaged in struggle over turf with the Information and Communication Technology Division of the same ministry in 2017. The dispute was regarding who had authority over the fiber optic network in Bangladesh. The dispute drew criticism from Bangladesh Parliament.

Constituent organisations
List of organisations and agencies under the division:
 Bangladesh Telecommunication Regulatory Commission
 Bangladesh Post Office
 Bangladesh Telecommunications Company Limited
 Bangladesh Submarine Cable Company Limited
 Teletalk Bangladesh Ltd
 Telephone Shilpa Sangstha
 Bangladesh Cable Shilpa Limited
 Department of Telecommunications 
 Mailing operator and courier services licensing authority
 Bangladesh Communication Satellite Company Limited

References

Government agencies of Bangladesh
1972 establishments in Bangladesh
Postal system of Bangladesh
Organisations based in Dhaka
Ministry of Posts, Telecommunications and Information Technology